Tough Sh*t: Life Advice from a Fat, Lazy Slob Who Did Good is a 2012 book of memoirs by the writer and filmmaker Kevin Smith, covering a range of topics such as Smith's childhood, early film career, relationships with actors and celebrities, and his public feud with Southwest Airlines. The book placed on The New York Times Best Seller list for nonfiction for two weeks following its release.

In the Comic Book Men episode "Tough Sh*t", Smith promotes the book by doing a signing at Jay & Silent Bob's Secret Stash.

References

2012 non-fiction books
American memoirs
Show business memoirs
Works by Kevin Smith
Gotham Books books